Events from the year 1890 in Scotland.

Incumbents 

 Secretary for Scotland and Keeper of the Great Seal – The Marquess of Lothian

Law officers 
 Lord Advocate – James Robertson
 Solicitor General for Scotland – Moir Tod Stormonth Darling; then Sir Charles Pearson

Judiciary 
 Lord President of the Court of Session and Lord Justice General – Lord Glencorse
 Lord Justice Clerk – Lord Kingsburgh

Events 
 11 February – the Partick by-election in Lanarkshire is won by the Liberal Unionist candidate James Parker Smith.
 4 March – the Forth Bridge (1,710 ft) is opened to rail traffic.
 15 May – new elected county councils in Scotland, created by the Local Government (Scotland) Act 1889, take up their powers. The County of Edinburgh formally adopts the title Midlothian; the formerly administratively separate counties of Ross and Cromarty are merged; former enclaves of Moray in Inverness-shire and vice versa are absorbed into the surrounding counties; and the Shetland county council formally adopts the spelling Zetland.
 Tunnock's bakers established in Uddingston.
 Construction of the village of Fortingall on Sir Donald Currie's Glenlyon Estate in Perthshire begins to "Arts and Crafts" vernacular designs by James MacLaren (died 20 October).
 East End Exhibition opens in Glasgow and International Exhibition of Science, Art & Industry staged in Edinburgh.

The arts
 William McGonagall's Poetic Gems published.

Births 
 3 January – Willa Muir, born Wilhelmina Johnston Anderson, translator (died 1970)
 30 January – Andy Cunningham, international footballer (died 1973)
 10 September – Mortimer Wheeler, archaeologist (died 1976)
 Mary Newbery Sturrock, artist and designer (died 1955)

Deaths 
 3 May – James B. Beck, United States Senator from Kentucky (1877–1890) (born 1822)
 2 June – Sir George Burns, shipowner (born 1795)
 25 June – Sir James Gowans, architect and building contractor (born 1821)
 10 August – William Edward Baxter, businessman, travel writer and Liberal Member of Parliament for Montrose Burghs (1855–1885) (born 1825)
 22 November – William Bell Scott, artist and poet (born 1811)

See also 
 Timeline of Scottish history
 1890 in the United Kingdom

References 

 
Years of the 19th century in Scotland
Scotland
1890s in Scotland